Harperman is a 2015 protest song about Canadian prime minister Stephen Harper. It was written by Anthony (Tony) Turner, an Ottawa folksinger who worked as a government scientist at Environment Canada, studying migratory birds.

Issues referenced 
The following issues are referenced, in the order that they appear in the song.
Harper's controlling attitude
Canadian Senate expenses scandal, especially concerning Mike Duffy
Environmental policy of Canada
Cuts to CBC
Veterans
Beverley McLachlin
Prorogation of parliament, especially during the 2008-09 parliamentary dispute
Missing and Murdered Indigenous Women
Fair Elections Act
Refusal to listen to, and silencing of, scientists
Labeling people "terrorists"
Suppressing freedom of the press
Tough stance on crime
Oil sands
Omnibus bills

Background 
Turner worked by day in habitat planning at Environment Canada, where he was coordinating a project to map priority areas for migratory birds. In March 2015, the 62-year-old Turner entered a songwriting contest, where he was given a choice between "a song of hope or a song of protest." With the election coming up, he chose the latter and won the contest. Turner was inspired by an article in JUSTnews, the newsletter of the Canadian Unitarians for Social Justice which listed a dozen ways the Harper government had attacked democracy. Turner added  to the list and created a nine verse song that was recorded on 12 June. Turner was backed by members of various community choirs, social action groups and concerned citizens. The video was posted to YouTube on the 22nd, where it has been widely viewed.

Reaction 
On August 10, Turner was suspended with pay. The song was deemed to violate the code of neutrality that civil servants were expected to follow. Turner, who was close to retirement, decided to retire rather than wait out an investigation. However, the song caught on the popular mood, and on September 17 a cross-country sing-along was held in dozens of cities as well a large rally on Parliament Hill.

References

External links 
harperman.ca

2015 songs
Canadian songs
Protest songs